Ngawang Lobzang Jampel Tsultrim Gyatso (ngag dbang blo bzang 'jam dpal tshul khrims rgya mtsho) or Tsultrim Gyatso (29 March 1816 – 30 September 1837) was the 10th Dalai Lama of Tibet, and born in Chamdo. He was fully ordained in the Gelug school of Tibetan Buddhism, studied the sutras and tantras, had several students, and rebuilt the Potala Palace.

Tsultrim Gyatso was born to a modest family known as Drongto Norbutsang (grong stod nor bu tshang) in Chamdo, eastern Tibet. His father was Lobzang Nyendrak (blo bzang snyan grags) and his mother was Namgyel Butri (rnam rgyal bu khrid). The ninth Dalai Lama Lungtok Gyatso had died in 1815, and five years would pass before his incarnation was found. 

Tsultrim Gyatso was chosen from a field of six potential incarnates of the ninth Dalai Lama Lungtok Gyatso (ta la'i bla ma 09 lung rtogs rgya mtsho). Preferred as the best by the oracle and government officials in 1820, he travelled to Lhasa in 1821 after which the regent Demo Ngawang Lobzang Tubten Jigme Gyatso died. The Qing emperor's representatives then insisted a golden urn be used to confirm the incarnation, delaying the enthronement for a year.

During that year of delay, Tibetan historians state "Tibetan officials allowed the amban announced that the Urn had been used to satisfy the Emperor, despite the reality that the Urn had not been employed."

The enthronement of the 10th Dalai Lama Tsultrim Gyatso at the Potala Palace occurred in 1822, on the eighth day of the eighth month of the water-horse year.

Soon after his enthronement in 1822, the Dalai Lama received his pre-novice ordination from the Seventh Panchen Lama Lobzang Palden Tenpai Nyima (paN chen bla ma 04 blo bzang dpal ldan bstan pa'i nyi ma) and gave him the name Ngawang Lobzang Jampel Tsultrim Gyatso (ngag dbang blo bzang 'jam dpal tshul khrims rgya mtsho). The following month he became a novice monk. His father received a title and the Yutok estate, which initiated a noble Tibetan family line.  

In 1825 in his 10th year, the Dalai Lama had many tutors and was enrolled at Drepung Monastery and studied both sutra and tantra. He likely studied at Ganden Monastery and Sera Monastery as well. He studied Tibetan Buddhist texts extensively during the rest of his life.

In 1830, the Dalai Lama was put in charge of the Tibetan state, and a report called the "Iron-Tiger Report" on agriculture and tax policies was prepared. In 1831 the Dalai Lama reconstructed the Potala Palace.
 
In 1834 the Dalai Lama gave teachings to the Fifth Kalkha and to the Mongolian King of Torgo, and sent senior monks to Mongolia to establish a Kalacakra center there.

The Dalai Lama set about to overhaul the economic structure of Tibet but, unfortunately, did not live long enough to see his plans come to fruition. After becoming ill in 1834 during an epidemic breakout in Lhasa, the Dalai Lama received his full Gelong ordination from the Panchen Lama in his nineteenth year. He remained in poor health for three years and died in 1837.

Despite his death in his 22nd year, he was said to have had several students from Tibet and Bhutan. The 10th Dalai Lama's body was installed in a golden reliquary in the Potala Palace called The Supreme Ornament of the Three Realms” (gser gdung khams gsum rgyan mchog).

References

Further reading
Mullin, Glenn H. (2001). The Fourteen Dalai Lamas: A Sacred Legacy of Reincarnation, pp. 353–361. Clear Light Publishers. Santa Fe, New Mexico. .

1816 births
1837 deaths
A0
Child monarchs from Asia
19th-century Tibetan people